The James H. Dodson Residence is a Los Angeles Historic-Cultural Monument (HCM #147) located in the San Pedro community of Los Angeles, California, near the Port of Los Angeles.

History

The Victorian Stick-Eastlake style wooden house was built in 1881 by the Sepúlveda family as a wedding present for their daughter Rudecinda and her husband, James Dodson. 

It was originally located at the corner of 7th and Beacon Streets in San Pedro.  It is a private residence and is not open to the public.

See also
 List of Los Angeles Historic-Cultural Monuments in the Harbor area

References

Dodson Residence
Dodson Residence
Dodson Residence
Los Angeles Historic-Cultural Monuments
Dodson Residence
Dodson Residence
Dodson Residence
1881 establishments in California